Kim Heon Jeong became the 11th Secretary General of the Constitutional Court of Korea on November 8, 2017.

References

Living people
South Korean judges
Year of birth missing (living people)